Uly-Aryama (Olo Ärämä) is a rural locality (a village) in Kucherbayevsky Selsoviet, Blagovarsky District, Bashkortostan, Russia. The population was 117 as of 2010. There is 1 street.

Geography 
Uly-Aryama is located 32 km north of Yazykovo (the district's administrative centre) by road. Syntashtamak is the nearest rural locality.

References 

Rural localities in Blagovarsky District